The Gunsynd Classic is a Brisbane Racing Club Group 3 Thoroughbred horse race for horses aged three years old, at set weights, over a distance of 1,600 metres, at Eagle Farm Racecourse, Brisbane, Australia during the Queensland Winter Racing Carnival. Total prizemoney is A$200,000.

History
The race is named in honour of Gunsynd, the champion miler of the early 1970s known as the Goondiwindi Grey.

Name
1989–2009 – Doomben Classic
2010 onwards - Gunsynd Classic

Grade
 Before 1996 - Listed race
 1997 onwards - Group 3

Distance

1989–1999 – 1615 metres 
2000 – 1640 metres
2001–2009 – 1615 metres
2010–2014 – 1600 metres
 2015 – 1800 metres
 2016 – 1630 metres
 2017 – 1600 metres
 2018 – 1630 metres
 2019 – 1600 metres
 2020 – 1800 metres
 2021 – 1600 metres

Venue

1997–2013 - Doomben Racecourse
2014 - Eagle Farm Racecourse
2015 - Gold Coast Racecourse
2016 - Doomben Racecourse
2017 - Eagle Farm Racecourse
2018 - Doomben Racecourse
2019 onwards - Eagle Farm Racecourse

Winners

 2021 - Ayrton
 2020 - Supergiant
 2019 - Gem Song
 2018 - Villermont
 2017 - Dreams Aplenty
 2016 - Cylinder Beach
 2015 - Worthy Cause
 2014 - Hopfgarten
 2013 - Proverb
 2012 - Meeting abandoned 
 2011 - Chateau Fort
 2010 - Sanderson
 2009 - Za Magic
 2008 - Pepperwood
 2007 - Reigning To Win
 2006 - Belmonte
 2005 - Saxon
 2004 - Drunken Joker
 2003 - Bobs Boy
 2002 - Galroof
 2001 - Arrabeea
 2000 - Akhenaton
 1999 - Tobruk
 1998 - Enforced
 1997 - Marble Halls
 1996 - Kidmans Cove
 1995 - Matsqui
 1994 - What A Poet
 1993 - Slanchyvah
 1992 - Pagos King
 1991 - Brunchtime
 1990 - Stylish Century
 1989 - Swain

See also
 List of Australian Group races
 Group races

References

Horse races in Australia
Recurring sporting events established in 1989
1989 establishments in Australia